Monument Mall is a shopping centre in central Newcastle upon Tyne, England. Formerly owned by St Martins Property Group, it was acquired by the retail property company Hammerson for £28m in March 2011.

The Mall opened in 1990 adjacent to the Monument station on the Tyne and Wear Metro. It is also directly in front of Grey's Monument and Grey Street, and has an entrance on Northumberland Street.

Refurbishment
In December 2011, planning permission was granted to reconfigure the shopping mall to provide an additional 14,000 ft² of retail floor space, infill the atrium and walkways at all levels, and create eight well-configured ground floor unit shops with flexible floor plates and with basement trading potential. The refurbishment cost £15 million.

Since the refurbishment, all stores that were originally located in Monument Mall have closed, except for TK Maxx (which opened a new flagship store in November 2012) and the entrance to Fenwick (which was reopened in December 2013).

The refurbishment has attracted high-end brands to open stores here:
 Molton Brown
 Hugo Boss opened a 450m² store.
 The White Company opened a 420m² store.
 Fat Face opened a 490m² store.
 Reiss opened a 334m² flagship store.
 Michael Kors 
 Rox Jewellery and watches, a Scottish brand, opened their first store in England, a 286m², two-floor store
 Jack Wills opened a 453m², two-floor flagship.
 A Jamie's Italian restaurant, a brand owned by chef Jamie Oliver.
 The Botanist subsidiary to The New World Trading Company 
 Kiehl's

References

Shopping centres in Tyne and Wear
Buildings and structures in Newcastle upon Tyne
St Martins Property Group